Frederik Buch (8 December 1875 – 13 April 1925) was a Danish film actor of the silent era in Denmark. He starred in over 100 films, and prolifically worked under Lau Lauritzen Sr.

Filmography
His New Grey Trousers (1915)
En slem Dreng (1915)
De besejrede Pebersvende (1914)

External links

 Frederik Buch at the Danish Film Institute

Danish male stage actors
Danish male film actors
Danish male silent film actors
20th-century Danish male actors
1875 births
1925 deaths